Rodolfo Falzoni (10 September 1925 – 18 March 2002) was an Italian racing cyclist. He won stage 3 of the 1951 Giro d'Italia in Milan, Italy.

References

External links
 

1925 births
2002 deaths
Italian male cyclists
Italian Giro d'Italia stage winners
Place of birth missing
Cyclists from the Province of Verona